The Two Misanthropists (Italian: I due misantropi) is a 1937 Italian "white-telephones" historical comedy film directed by Amleto Palermi and starring Camillo Pilotto, María Denis and Nino Besozzi.

It was shot at the Cines Studios and Cinecittà in Rome. The film's sets were designed by the art director Giorgio Pinzauti.

Plot

Cast
 Camillo Pilotto as Don Pedro di Alcazar, il tutore 
 María Denis as Betty 
 Nino Besozzi as Damiano Bertelet 
 Enrico Viarisio as Marcello, parrucchiere 
 Sergio Tofano as Cosimo Bertelet 
 Nella Maria Bonora as Maria Grazia 
 Marcello Giorda as Don Ramiro Mayoz 
 Nicola Maldacea as Nicola, il domestico 
 Niní Gordini Cervi as Giuseppina 
 Olga Vittoria Gentilli as Signora Argia 
 Giulio Alfieri
 Ernesto Torrini

References

Bibliography 
 Roberto Chiti & Roberto Poppi. I film: Tutti i film italiani dal 1930 al 1944. Gremese Editore, 2005.

External links 
 

1937 films
1930s historical comedy films
Italian historical comedy films
Italian black-and-white films
1930s Italian-language films
Films directed by Amleto Palermi
Cines Studios films
Films shot at Cinecittà Studios
Films set in the 1900s
1937 comedy films
Films scored by Alessandro Cicognini
1930s Italian films